is a JR West Geibi station located in Hirako, Saijō-chō, Shōbara, Hiroshima Prefecture, Japan. 

Hirako Station features one station-side platform.

History
1987-04-01: Japan National Railways is privatized, and Hirako Station becomes a JR West station

Around the station
The Saijō River is located across Route 183 from Hirako Station. The Hirako Branch Post Office is located near the station.

Highway access
Japan National Route 183
Hiroshima Prefectural Route 26 (Shin'ichi Nanamagari Saijō Route) is located northeast of the station.

Connecting lines
All lines are JR West lines.
Geibi Line
Bingo Saijō Station — Hirako Station — Taka Station

External links
 JR West

Geibi Line
Railway stations in Hiroshima Prefecture
Shōbara, Hiroshima